Sidoine Beaullia (born 28 August 1983) is a Congolese retired football midfielder.

References

1983 births
Living people
Republic of the Congo footballers
Republic of the Congo international footballers
Étoile du Congo players
Saint Michel d'Ouenzé players
AC Léopards players
Association football midfielders
AS Police (Brazzaville) players